Eliya IX ( / Elīyā, died 17 May 1700) was Patriarch of the Church of the East from 1660 to 1700, with his residence in Rabban Hormizd Monastery, near Alqosh, in modern Iraq. He was a "vigorous defender of the traditional faith", and on several occasions acted against local representatives of the Catholic Church in the region. His correspondence with Rome, in 1668–1669, ended without agreement on the discussed issues.

In older historiography, he was designated as Eliya IX, but later renumbered as Eliya "X" by some authors. After the resolution of several chronological questions, he was designated again as Eliya IX, and that numeration is accepted in recent scholarly works.

See also
 Patriarch of the Church of the East
 List of Patriarchs of the Church of the East
 Assyrian Church of the East

Notes

References

External links 

Patriarchs of the Church of the East
17th-century bishops of the Church of the East
1700 deaths
Year of birth missing
17th-century archbishops
18th-century archbishops
Bishops in the Ottoman Empire
18th-century bishops of the Church of the East
Assyrians from the Ottoman Empire
17th-century people from the Ottoman Empire
18th-century people from the Ottoman Empire